The Men's sprint was one of the 6 men's events at the 2010 European Track Championships, held in Pruszków, Poland.

28 cyclists participated in the contest.

The event was held on November 6.

World record

Qualifying
Fastest 24 riders advanced to 1/16 finals.

1/16 Finals
Winner of each heat qualified to 1/8 Finals. Chris Hoy, fastest cyclist of the qualifying, lost against Felix English who entered the 1/8 finals with the slowest time.

1/8 Finals
Winner of each heat qualified to 1/4 Finals. Losers went to repêchages.

1/8 Finals Repechage

Quarterfinals

Race for 5th-8th Places

Semifinals

Finals

References

Qualifying Results
1/16 Results
1/8 Results
1/8 Repechages Results
Quarterfinals Results
5-8th Race Results
Semifinals Results
Finals Results

Men's sprint
European Track Championships – Men's sprint